John Chaunce (fl. 1363–1388) of Reigate, Surrey, was an English Member of Parliament for Reigate in 1363, 1366, 1368, 1372, May 1382, November 1384 and February 1388.

References

14th-century births
Year of death missing
14th-century English people
English MPs 1363
English MPs 1366
English MPs 1368
English MPs 1372
English MPs May 1382
English MPs November 1384
English MPs February 1388
People from Reigate